Charlie Greene is a retired American soccer player who played professionally in the North American Soccer League, American Soccer League, Major Indoor Soccer League and American Indoor Soccer Association.

Professional
In 1980, Greene played for the Miami Americans of the American Soccer League.  He moved up to the California Surf of the first division North American Soccer League in late 1980. He played the 1980–81 indoor season and the 1981 outdoor season with the Surf.  In the fall of 1981, Greene moved indoors with the New Jersey Rockets of the Major Indoor Soccer League.  He spent one season with the Rockets, then moved back outdoors in 1982 with the Georgia Generals of the ASL.  He returned to the indoor game that fall with the Cleveland Force.  He played the 1988-1989 season with the Hershey Impact of the American Indoor Soccer Association.  That year he was a first team All AISA selection.  On July 14, 1989, the Cleveland Crunch signed Greene to a one-year contract.

Yearly Awards
 1988-89 AISA All-Star Team

References

External links
NASL/MISL stats

1959 births
Living people
American Indoor Soccer Association players
American soccer players
American Soccer League (1933–1983) players
California Surf players
Cleveland Crunch players
Cleveland Force (original MISL) players
Georgia Generals players
Hershey Impact players
Kansas City Comets (original MISL) players
Major Indoor Soccer League (1978–1992) players
Miami Americans players
North American Soccer League (1968–1984) players
North American Soccer League (1968–1984) indoor players
New Jersey Rockets (MISL) players
Pittsburgh Spirit players
Association football defenders
Association football forwards